Eugenio Montessoro (14 January 1912 – 12 December 1998) was an Italian equestrian. He competed in two events at the 1948 Summer Olympics.

References

External links
 

1912 births
1998 deaths
Italian male equestrians
Olympic equestrians of Italy
Equestrians at the 1948 Summer Olympics
Place of birth missing